Denny Ray Canterbury, Jr. (born February 19, 1969) is an American politician and a Republican member of the West Virginia House of Delegates representing District 42 since January 12, 2013. Canterbury served consecutively from January 2001 until January 2013 in a District 28 seat.

Education
Canterbury earned his BA from the University of Chicago and his MBA from West Virginia University.

Elections
2012 Redistricted to District 42, Canterbury placed first in the three-way May 8, 2012 Republican Primary with 1,652 votes (54.7%), and placed first in the four-way two-position November 6, 2012 General election with 7,831 votes (32.7%) ahead of Republican nominee George Ambler and non-selectees Democratic nominees Steve Hunter (who had run in 2000 and 2002) and Glenn Singer.
1998 To challenge District 28 Democratic incumbent Representatives Thomas Campbell and Carroll Willis, Canterbury was unopposed for the 1998 Republican Primary but lost the three-way two-position November 3, 1998 General election to Representatives Campbell and Willis.
2000 When Representative Willis left the Legislature and left a district seat open, Canterbury was unopposed for the 2000 Republican Primary and was elected in the three-way two-position November 7, 2000 General election alongside Representative Campbell (D).
2002 Canterbury was unopposed for the 2002 Republican Primary and was re-elected in the three-way two-position November 5, 2002 General election alongside Representative Campbell (D).
2004 Canterbury was joined in the 2004 Republican Primary and was re-elected in the four-way two-position November 2, 2004 General election alongside Representative Campbell (D).
2006 Canterbury was joined in the 2006 Republican Primary and was re-elected in the four-way two-position November 7, 2006 General election alongside Representative Campbell (D).
2008 Canterbury was unopposed for the May 13, 2008 Republican Primary, winning with 1,817 votes, and placed second in the three-way two-position November 4, 2008 General election with 7,849 votes (35.9%) behind Representative Campbell and ahead of Democratic nominee Joan Browning.
2010 Canterbury was unopposed for the May 11, 2010 Republican Primary, winning with 1,209 votes, and placed first in the three-way two-position November 2, 2010 General election with 6,254 votes (40.0%) ahead of Representative Campbell (D) and Democratic nominee Michael Knisely.

References

External links
Official page at the West Virginia Legislature

Denny Canterbury at Ballotpedia
Ray Canterbury at the National Institute on Money in State Politics

1969 births
Living people
Republican Party members of the West Virginia House of Delegates
Politicians from Charleston, West Virginia
People from Ronceverte, West Virginia
University of Chicago alumni
West Virginia University alumni
21st-century American politicians